Harlan Edmonds is an American politician and a Republican member of the Wyoming House of Representatives representing District 12 from January 5, 2015, until his resignation on August 15, 2016.  His wife, Amy Edmonds, was a member of the Wyoming House of Representatives for the 12th district from 2007 until 2013.

Elections

2014
Edmonds was offered the Republican nomination after mounting a successful write-in campaign. He then defeated incumbent Democratic Representative Lee Filer 53% to 47%.

2016
Edmonds did not run for re-election. He resigned on August 15, 2016, after having moved out of the district.

References

External links
Official page at the Wyoming Legislature
Edmonds Profile from Ballotpedia

Living people
Republican Party members of the Wyoming House of Representatives
University of Kansas alumni
University of Missouri alumni
Politicians from Cheyenne, Wyoming
Year of birth missing (living people)